NBY, or nby, may refer to:

 nby, the ISO 639-3 code for the Ningera language spoken in Sandaun Province, Papua New Guinea
 NBY, the National Rail code for Newbury railway station in the county of Berkshire, UK
 NBY, the NYSE American stock exchange code for NovaBay Pharmaceuticals, a US biopharmaceutical company

See also